Pico Jano is a mountain of Cantabria (northern Spain).

Geography 

The mountain is part of the range dividing the valleys of rivers Deva and Quiviesa. Located between the municipalities of Camaleño and Vega de Liébana, both in Liébana, its highest point is occupied by a pillar used as trig point, whose base is at  m. The mountain must not be confused with another Pico Jano close to Bárcena de Pie de Concha.

Access to the summit
An easy and well waymarked route to Pico Jano starts from Dobarganes, a village of Vega de Liébana municipality. Its length is about 4 km. The summit can also be reached by mountain bike. Pico Jano offers views of Picos de Europa.

References

External links

 Photos and info about Pico Jano

Mountains of Cantabria
One-thousanders of Spain